The Royal Lao Government in Exile (RLGE) is a Laotian government in exile opposed to the Lao People's Democratic Republic. It purports to seek to institute a constitutional monarchy in Laos that ensures freedom, justice, peace, and prosperity for the Lao people.

Organization 
The Royal Lao Government in Exile claims that it is an interim democratic government consisting of eighty representatives from Lao political organizations and associations elected by the Lao people inside Laos and abroad. The Royal Lao Government in Exile is chaired by Professor Khamphoui Sisavatdy, who claims to have previously served in the former Royal Lao Government under H.M. King Savang Vatthana of Laos as a Deputy in the National Assembly and was a Professor of Lao History at Sisavangvong University. In 1972, he traveled to the United States with a Lao delegation to speak to Secretary of State Henry Kissinger concerning a series of proposed Geneva Convention treaties.
 
The Supreme National Political Council in Exile is reportedly chaired by H.E. Phraya Sithidej (Sithat Sithibourn), former Lao Governor, former Lao Congressman and former President of Political and Law Commission of the Lao National Parliament.

The Royal Laos Defence Forces under RLGE claim to be led by General Saveng Vongsavath, former Colonel of the Royal Lao Army and the military Commander of the Lao People's National Liberation Front (LPNLF).

Allegedly, the only royal family member of Laos that held a position within RLGE is Brigadier-General H.H. Prince (Sadu Chao Jaya) Muni Varman Kindama Varman [Monivong Kindavong]. He was the Vice-President of the Supreme National Political Council in Exile until his death in 2004. H.H. Prince Monivong Kindavong was born in 1928, received education in École des Officiers d’Applications (EOA), in 1973 he was promoted as a Brigadier-General of the Royal Lao Army. H.H. Prince Monivong Kindavong's father is H.H. Prince (Sadu Chao Jaya) Kindama Varman [Kindavong], who was a Delegate for Upper Laos and representative of H.M. The King to the Provisional Government of France in 1946. H.H. Prince Kindavong served as a Prime Minister from 23 April 1946 until 15 March 1947 and as a Minister of State from 1947 to 1948. H.H. Prince Kindavong is the son of H.H Prince Chao Maha Oupahat Bounkhong, the last Vice-King of Luang Prabang and a nephew of King Sisavang Vong. H.H. Prince Kindavong is also a younger half-brother of H.H. Prince Phetsarath Ratanavongsa, who was prime minister of Laos from 1942 to 1945, and the first and last Vice-King of the Kingdom of Laos and a brother of H.H. Prince Souvanna Phouma, a Prime Minister of the Kingdom of Laos several times from 1951–1954, 1956–1958, 1960 and 1962–1975.

History 
The Royal Lao Government in Exile (RLGE) reportedly was proclaimed on May 6, 2003, according to itself. On June 16, 2003 by permission of the Secretary of the State of Oregon Royal Lao Government in Exile was incorporated under the Oregon Nonprofit Corporation Act. On June 23, 2003, the RLGE signed an agreement with Free Vietnamese Government in Santa Ana, California, to join hands between the two governments with a mutual goal of fighting against Laos and Vietnam. On June 25, 2003, the RLGE was granted audience with the United Nations Secretarial Office in New York City followed by audience with the U.S. States Department in Washington, D.C. on June 26, 2003.

On July 5, 2003, the RLGE reportedly claims that a reformation Ministerial Conference was held in city of Murfreesboro, Tennessee, USA for an official announcement of its policies and national agendas. The second reformation was passed in on 23 March 2004 in Las Vegas, Nevada, USA for official announcement of restoration and revival of Lao National Army in the same form as it was until 1975. The third reformation was passed in on September 2, 2004 in the city of San Diego, California, USA. The fourth reformation was passed in on 25 March 2005 in the city of Sacramento, California, USA. In this meeting members of RLGE voted H.E. Khamphoui Sisavatdy to continue his term as the Prime Minister of the Royal Lao Government in Exile. The fifth reformation was passed in October 2005 in the city of Fresno, California. In this meeting RLGE decided to accept to let Hmong ethnic people into RLGE. The sixth reformation was passed in on 25 September 2010 in the city of New Iberia in the state of Louisiana. In this meeting members of RLGE voted H.E. Khamphoui Sisavatdy to continue his term as the Prime Minister of the Royal Lao Government in Exile until Lao Democracy is restored. In this meeting RLGE issued a public statement no. PMO/060/2010 based on the U.S Congress resolutions 240, 169, 309, 318, 204 and on the European Parliamentary Resolution on Laos on February 15, 2002 and to observe the Geneva Accords of 1954 and 1962 on Laos under the real condition of the current time in Laos and also solving Lao problems peacefully and politically, we the patriotic Nationalist people of Laos would like to proclaim to the International Communities and to the Lao people inside Laos and abroad that the Royal Lao Government has been restored and revived to take full responsibility on the affairs on Laos under the leadership of the people in charge of government in exile temporarily.

Prime ministers

Recent activities 
 Kerry and Kay Danes are an Australian husband and wife who were controversially arrested and subjected to physical violence on 23 December 2000 by authorities in Laos. The Danes were detained without charge in a detention centre in Vientiane, Laos, for six months until formal charges were laid on 13 June 2001. According to the Australian Foreign Ministry, the Danes were wrongly accused by the Pathet Lao officials in Laos of embezzlement, destruction of evidence and violation of Laotian tax regulations. On 28 June 2001, the Danes were taken to the Laotian Municipal Court in Vientiane where they faced trial by a judge and prosecutor appointed by communist officials. The already typed judgment was delivered within 25 minutes. Found guilty, they were sentenced to 7 years imprisonment and ordered to pay compensation, which led to the intervention of the Australian Government. On 6 November 2001 the Danes were pardoned by the President of Laos. After their ordeal, Kay Danes became a human rights advocate and in 2012 was named as an Australian of the Year state finalist. Following the release of Kerry and Kay Danes in Laos, Kay Danes was invited to speak at the U.S. Congressional Forum on Laos in Washington, D.C., in the U.S. House of Representatives and the Library of Congress, where she testified in 2002 and on numerous occasions on Capitol Hill regarding human rights violations in Laos and the plight of political prisoners and foreign prisoners held by the communist government of Laos. Kay Danes was appointed an Honorary Advisor to the Executive Office of the Prime Minister representing the Royal Lao Government in Exile. She is recognised throughout the Laotian community as the most effective mover they have had, as an ally, in their long-standing struggle for freedom from persecution. She was a driving force behind the establishment of the United Lao Action Centre in Washington DC - to give a voice to those seeking to uphold the rights of victims of human rights abuses and victims of injustice. Kay Danes lobbied at several US Congressional Forums for greater consideration to new foreign investors embarking on new business ventures in Laos, to avoid some of the pitfalls of working in such a challenging environment. One of the many highlights of her advocacy was to engage the US Government, in particular, President George Bush's direct representative, in a debate on the Normalised Trade Relations Agreement  between the US and Laos, insisting on greater protections for foreigners investing in Laos, prior to its implementation. The NTR agreement was effectively delayed until such assurances could be given.
 In recent years the RLGE has demanded that Communist Vietnamese troops withdraw their forces from Laos. They have also requested confirmation of this withdrawal, and that United Nations peace-keeping troops should be mandated to enter Laos in order to ensure a smooth transition.
 10 August 2004 Lowell, Massachusetts, USA became the first city in the world who officially recognizes the Kingdom of Laos flag, which was replaced when Communists overthrew the Laotian Royal family in 1975. In August 2006 following the parade, a brief flag-raising ceremony took place at the steps of City Hall to commemorate the second anniversary of Lowell's resolution to recognize the Lao traditional flag as the flag of the Lao-American population of Lowell and proclamations from Gov. Mitt Romney, the Massachusetts Senate, Massachusetts House of Representatives, and U.S. Congress were read aloud.
 From February 6 to 8, 2006 H.E. Khamphoui Sisavatdy was invited to Washington, D.C. for meetings and discussions with U.S. government officials.
 The Royal Lao Government in Exile condemns national elections in Laos as a "charade." Chairman Sisavatdy has called for a move to a more liberal democracy system with multiple political parties.
 On 13 October 2011 Mr. Chris Hayes, MP gave a speech in Australian House of Representatives about the Royal Lao Government in Exile. He showed his support to the RLGE and also stated that he is very proud to work closely with the Laotian community living in Australia.
 In 2014 the RLGE established the Association of the Envoys Extraordinary of the Royal Lao Government in Exile Worldwide (hereinafter referred to as "the association"), which serves as the RLGE premier diplomatic network institution. The association has a worldwide network of representatives and is registered in the Transparency Register under the identification no. 367750013759–35. The Transparency register has been set up and is operated by the European Parliament and the European Commission. The Council of the European Union supports this initiative.
 The Royal Lao Government in Exile claims to have about 900 anti-Communist fighters populating the border region of Laos, Thailand and Cambodia. This has not, however, been confirmed by any independent sources.

See also
Kingdom of Laos
Laotian Civil War
Soulivong Savang (pretender to the Laotian throne)

General:
 Insurgency in Laos

References

External links 
 The Association of the Envoys Extraordinary of the Royal Lao Government in Exile Worldwide, AEERLGE 
 Transparency Register 
 RLGE 
 ROYAL GOVERNMENT OF LAO (RGLAO) 
 https://web.archive.org/web/20060512160353/http://www.hmongtoday.com/displaynews.asp?ID=2135 
 https://web.archive.org/web/20130729095044/http://www.music.us/education/R/Royal-Lao-Government-in-Exile.htm 
 Business registry of Oregon RLGE

Laos
Politics of Laos
Political organizations based in Laos
Laotian anti-communists
Monarchism in Laos
Monarchist organizations
Anti-communist organizations